Sceptridium is a genus of seedless vascular plants in the family Ophioglossaceae, closely allied to (and often included as a subgenus of) the genus Botrychium (the moonworts and grapeferns).  It is also closely related to the genus Botrypus (the rattlesnake fern, often treated as the subgenus Osmundopteris under Botrychium). Sceptridium species are commonly called the grape-ferns.

These plants are small with fleshy roots, and reproduce by spores shed into the air. They differ from the moonworts in having at least some sterile fronds (all fronds in Botrychium are spore-bearing), and in the fronds being bi- or tri-pinnate (Botrychium are single pinnate, or rarely bipinnate); and from Botrypus in being evergreen, or at least winter-green (Botrypus are deciduous) and having the non-spore-bearing part of the frond long-stalked (short-stalked in Botrypus).

Phylogeny
Phylogeny of Sceptridium

Species

 S. × argutum Sahashi
 S. atrovirens Sahashi
 S. australe (Brown) Lyon (parsley fern)
 S. biforme (Col.) Lyon (fine-leaved parsley fern)
 S. biternatum (Sav.) Lyon (sparse-lobed grapefern, southern grapefern)
 S. daucifolium (Wallich ex Hooker & Greville) Lyon
 S. decompositum (von Martius & Gal.) Lyon
 S. dissectum (Spreng.) Lyon (cut-leaved grape-fern)
 S. × elegans Sahashi
 S. formosanum (Tagawa) Holub
 S. japonicum (Prantl) Lyon
 S. javanicum Sahashi
 S. jenmanii (Underwood) Lyon (Alabama grape-fern)
 S. × longistipitatum Sahashi
 S. lunarioides (Michaux) Holub (winter grapefern)
 S. microphyllum Sahashi
 S. multifidum (Gmelin) Nishida ex Tag. (leather grape-fern)
 S. nipponicum (Makino) Holub
 S. oneidense (Gilbert) Holub (blunt-leaved grape-fern)
 S. × pseudoternatum (Sahashi)
 S. × pulchrum Sahashi
 S. robustum (Rupr.) Lyon
 S. rugulosum (Wagner) Skoda & Holub (ternate grape-fern, St. Lawrence grape fern, rugulose grape fern)
 S. schaffneri (Underwood) Lyon
 S. × silvicola (Sahashi) Ebihara
 S. subbifoliatum (Brack.) Lyon (island grape-fern)
 S. ternatum (Thunberg) Lyon
 S. triangularifolium Sahashi
 S. underwoodianum (Maxon) Lyon

References

Ophioglossaceae
Fern genera